Wan Waithayakon (full title: His Royal Highness Prince Vanna Vaidhayakara, the Prince Naradhip Bongsprabandh), known in the West as Wan Waithayakon (1891–1976), was a Thai royal prince and diplomat. He was President of the Eleventh Session of the United Nations General Assembly (1956–1957), while serving as Thailand's Permanent Representative to the United Nations. He was a grandson of King Mongkut (Rama IV).

Early life and education
Prince Wan was born on 25 August 1891 in Bangkok. He began his education at Suan Kularb School and Rajvidyalai (King's College) before continuing his education in England where he earned a degree with honours in history from Oxford's Balliol College. Wan also attended the Ecole Libre des Sciences Politiques (better known as Sciences Po) in Paris.

Career
Prince Wan began his career as a foreign service officer in 1917. He was appointed advisor to his cousin, King Vajiravudh, in 1922. In 1924, he was promoted to the rank of under-secretary for foreign affairs, and was responsible for negotiating several important amendments to political and commercial treaties with Western powers.

He was sent to Europe again in 1926 as minister accredited to the United Kingdom, the Netherlands, and Belgium. During that period, he also served as head of the Thai delegation to the League of Nations, where he was active in a number of important commissions as member, vice-president, and president. Prince Wan returned to Thailand in 1930, to accept a professorial chair at the Faculty of Arts, Chulalongkorn University.

For the next 30 years, Prince Wan continued to serve his country in a number of important diplomatic missions, some of the notable milestones being negotiations with Japan in 1943 during World War II, representing Thailand at the Greater East Asia Conference, participation in the SEATO Council and the Bandung Conference, where he was elected rapporteur, and negotiations leading to Thailand's admission to the United Nations.

In 1947, Prince Wan was appointed ambassador to the United States and served concurrently as ambassador to the United Nations. In 1956, he was the president of the Eleventh Session of the United Nations' General Assembly. He also served as Thailand's foreign minister from 1952 to 1957 and again in 1958.

Language
Prince Wan's expertise in languages ranged from English and Pali to Sanskrit. He coined Thai words from English which are in use today. They include prachathipatai (democracy), ratthathammanoon (constitution), thanakarn (bank), and songkram (war). His proficiency in languages led to his being made president of the Royal Society of Thailand, the national arbiter of the Thai language. Prince Wan won many academic honours and is regarded as one of the founding fathers of philological textual criticism in Thailand.

Death
Prince Wan died on 5 September 1976, aged 85.

Honours

Foreign honours
  : Honorary Grand Commander of the Order of the Defender of the Realm (1964)
 : Grand Cross of the Order of the German Eagle
 : Grand Cross of the Order of the Sun of Peru
 : Grand Cordon of the Order of the Rising Sun
 : Grand Cross of the Order of Sikatuna
 : Grand Cross of the Royal Norwegian Order of Saint Olav
 : Grand Cross of the Order of Orange-Nassau
 : Grand Star of the Decoration of Honour for Services to the Republic of Austria
 : Padma Bhushan

Academic rank
 Professor of Chulalongkorn University

References 

Thai male Phra Ong Chao
19th-century Chakri dynasty
20th-century Chakri dynasty
Vorawan family
Ministers of Foreign Affairs of Thailand
Deputy Prime Ministers of Thailand
Presidents of the United Nations General Assembly
Permanent Representatives of Thailand to the United Nations
Permanent Representatives of Thailand to the League of Nations
Ambassadors of Thailand to the United States
Academic staff of Chulalongkorn University
Fellows of the Royal Society of Thailand
Knights Grand Cross of the Order of Chula Chom Klao
Recipients of the Dushdi Mala Medal, Pin of Arts and Science
Sciences Po alumni
1891 births
1976 deaths
Thai diplomats
Thai male Mom Chao
Thai academic administrators